Gnamptopelta is a genus of Ichneumonid wasp with one species in North America. The English translation of the word "Gnamptopelta" gives rise to the common name bent-shielded besieger wasp,  specifically the common name for Gnamptopelta obsidianator.

Gnamptopelta obsidianator is the only species of the genus in North America.

Explanation of name
Gnamptos = Bent, curved
pelta = A crescent shaped shield

Name refers to the curved, half-moon shaped abdomen, a common physical feature of these wasps.

Description
Wasps of this genus are large, glossy black, and have yellow antennae. They all have long "tails", really just elongated abdomens. They lack a stinger, and cannot inflict any harm. They, out of instinct, and in attempt to intimidate, will try to do so.

Behavior
These wasps are often seen in underbrush, where they are recognized in flight by the yellow antennae and long, curved abdomen. In the underbrush, they hunt and lay eggs on the caterpillars of cutworm moths. No burrow is dug, nor the prey transported anywhere. The eggs are laid inside the body of the caterpillar, and the caterpillar left on its leaf or stem. The eggs will hatch, the larvae will eat the caterpillar's insides, and then form cocoons on top of the body. The wasps mimic spider wasps of the family Pompilidae. Specifically, they mimic the genus Entypus, and species Pepsis menechma.

Similar genera
Thyreodon
Therion
Entypus

References

Ichneumonidae genera
Ichneumonidae